Bill C-2 refers to various legislation introduced into the House of Commons of Canada.  Because Bill C-1 is a pro forma bill asserting the independence of Parliament, Bill C-2 is the first substantive bill introduced into each session of the House.

Legislation introduced as Bill C-2 includes:
 An Act to amend the Criminal Code (protection of children and other vulnerable persons) and the Canada Evidence Act, introduced in 2004 to the first session of the 38th Parliament
 Federal Accountability Act, introduced in 2006 to the first session of the 39th Parliament

Canadian federal legislation